Downtown Des Moines is the central business district of Des Moines, Iowa and the Greater Des Moines Metropolitan Area. Downtown Des Moines is defined by the City of Des Moines as located between the Des Moines River to the east, the Raccoon River to the south, Center Street to the north, and 18th and 15th Streets to the west.

In 2014, Downtown Des Moines was listed as the number one "up-and-coming downtown" in America, by Fortune.com.

Demographics

Population
As of the 2010 Census, Downtown Des Moines, including the East Village, had a population of 5,431 with a total of 3,667 housing units, with 3,085 of those being occupied.

Race
According to the 2010 Census, 70.1% of the population was white; 20.8% was Black or African American; 4.7% was Asian; 1.9% was American Indian or Alaska Native; 0.2% was Native Hawaiian or Other Pacific Islander; and 5.7% reported Other. Of these percentages, 10.6% reported as white also reported Hispanic or Latino descent. The average household size was 1.58 members per household while the average family size was 2.83 members per family.

Economy

Downtown Des Moines boasts several corporate campuses, with Principal Financial Group's global headquarters calling downtown home. Other major corporations and downtown employers include Wellmark, Nationwide, Meredith Corporation, Voya, Wells Fargo, Banker's Trust, Ruan Transportation, and EMC Insurance Company. Many of these companies have made huge investments into downtown by building large, impressive corporate campuses. Most notable is Principal Financial Group's 801 Grand and surrounding campus, which is currently undergoing a $397 million renovation.

Transportation
Downtown Des Moines is connected to I-235, which runs past the north portion of downtown and connects downtown to I-80 and I-35. Other major thoroughfares connecting downtown to the remainder of the city are Fleur Drive, Martin Luther King, Jr. Parkway and Keosauqua Way. Major streets in downtown are Locust Street, Grand Ave, and Court Ave.

Downtown Des Moines is served by the Des Moines metro's transportation authority, Des Moines Area Regional Transit (DART). DART has several routes serving downtown, including a state-of-the-art, LEED certified transit station known as DART Central Station. Additionally, DART operates a free downtown shuttle on Route 42 known as the D-Line Shuttle. This shuttle runs from the steps of the Iowa State Capitol to the Pappajohn Sculpture Park.

Additionally, Des Moines is served by a wide variety of taxi cab companies. In 2014, the popular ride share service Uber was introduced, much to the dismay of the Des Moines City Council. Many members of the city council believe that Uber should follow local taxi regulations while others believe the service should operate as an app rather than a taxi service.

One unique aspect of Des Moines transportation is the expansive network of skywalks connecting the downtown buildings. The skywalk network is over four miles long and reaches as far as Wells Fargo Arena. Most of the skywalk system is air conditioned and features automatic doors. Expanded hours keep the skywalk open late into the night and early in the morning. The city has made an effort to better connect the skywalk system to the sidewalk, resulting in many new sidewalk access stairways and elevators throughout the system. The city has also created an expansive directory system to aid travelers in navigating the system.

Neighborhoods and districts

Downtown Des Moines has many unique and lively districts that each have their own individual style and culture. Downtown is also undergoing a resurgence that is quickly changing the retail and physical landscape of Des Moines.

While the Downtown Des Moines area is defined as the area between the Des Moines and Raccoon Rivers and 15th, 18th, and Center Streets, downtown includes neighborhoods extending all the way to I-235 to the north and Martin Luther King, Jr. Parkway to the west, as well as SE 14th Street to the east. With these boundaries, many new districts and neighborhoods are included.

Historic East Village

The Historic East Village lies east of the Des Moines River and west of the Iowa State Capitol. The district was once a collection of dilapidated, run-down buildings that were slated to be torn down. However, in 2000, a group of business leaders and concerned community members stepped in and began a decades-long transformation of the East Village.

Today, the East Village is a vibrant district filled with fine dining, unique retail destinations, antique stores, and many bars and clubs. Des Moines' collection of gay bars are also located within the East Village. Within the East Village, one can find many notable, nationally recognized restaurants, such as Zombie Burger and Drink Lab. Many of the buildings in the East Village are included on the National Register of Historic Places. Because of the recent renaissance and transition to a trendy, walkable neighborhood, many young professionals have flocked to the area. This helps contribute to the vibrant atmosphere of the district.

Civic Center Historic District

The Civic Center Historic District flanks both sides of the Des Moines and Raccoon Rivers and is listed on the National Register of Historic Places. The district is characterized by several public works buildings reflecting the Beaux-Arts style as well as ornate City Beautiful era balustrades, walkways, bridges, and lighting along the Des Moines River. Many of the buildings within the district were built between 1900 and 1928. The district still maintains much of the early 1900s era riverfront development.

Court Avenue District
The Court Avenue District is a boisterous bar and restaurant district in downtown Des Moines. The district runs along Court Avenue and is bounded by the Des Moines River on the East and the Polk County Courthouse  on the west. The district is known for its excellent nightlife and many bars and restaurants and the streets are dotted with period-style lanterns, planters, and advertisements. Street advertisements painted on the sidewalks is unique to the area. Also the oldest neighborhood in Des Moines, many of the buildings are unique and historic.

Throughout the summer, the Court Avenue District also plays home to the nationally recognized Downtown Des Moines Farmers Market. The Market boast over 300 vendors and is free and open to the public. Additionally, the Des Moines Bicycle Collective offers free valet parking for bikes, which is a unique feature of the Des Moines Farmers Market.

Western Gateway

The Western Gateway area of downtown is a modern, rehabilitated district characterized with a stunning, multimillion-dollar sculpture park and several gleaming corporate campuses. Western Gateway stretches from 10th Street in the east to 17th Street on the west, and from High Street on the North to Walnut Street to the south. Centered in the district is the John and Mary Pappajohn Sculpture Park, boasting 28 pieces of art over 4.4 acres of green park space. The sculpture park is free and open to the public and provides self-guided cell phone tours. On the eastern edge of the sculpture park is the iconic Des Moines Central Library. The library was designed by famed British architect David Chipperfield and is composed of floor to ceiling glass panels across the entire building and a green roof. The Temple for the Performing Arts also anchors the east end of the park.

Surrounding the park are several corporate campuses including the headquarters of Wellmark Blue Cross Blue Shield, Nationwide Insurance, Meredith Corporation, and ING. These buildings give the park an excellent frame and add to the energy of the area. Additionally, Kum and Go is constructing  a $92 million corporate headquarters designed by famed architect firm Renzo Piano.

Downtown Core

Though the center part of downtown is generally characterized by office space, a recent transformation has begun in the center of downtown. Many of the areas high rise buildings are slowly being converted into apartments, creating an urban neighborhood unlike any other in Des Moines. Central Downtown contains a large downtown mall known as the Kaleidoscope at the HUB, though it has struggled in recent years to remain viable and will soon be demolished to be replaced by a high rise apartment building. Central Downtown also uses a unique skywalk system that connects nearly every building in the district on the third floor crossing city streets. Several notable, highly visible buildings are located within the district including 801 Grand and the EMC Insurance Building. Additionally, the Des Moines Performing Arts is located within this district and boasts a nearly 5,000 seat performing arts space.

Since 2013, the City of Des Moines has been planning a revitalization of the Walnut Street Corridor. The city envisions a walkable, urban pathway dotted with high end retail and restaurants. Public gathering and green space will be included to complement the completion of the newly renovated Cowles Commons.

Parks and recreation space
Des Moines has a wide area of green space available to its downtown residents and visitors. The John and Mary Pappajohn Sculpture park is one example of an expensive green space available for public use. Additionally, the green areas surrounding the Des Moines Central Library and the Temple for Performing Arts are also intended for public use.

Downtown is connected to the Iowa network of trails via several trails, including the Meredith Trail. The Meredith Trail connects downtown to the adjacent Gray's Lake Park, and expansive park featuring a large lake and several walking paths and trails.

Cowles Commons is a recently completed public gathering space featuring a large sculpture and water features among trees and foliage. Cowles Commons will serve as an oasis and event space among the skyscrapers of downtown.

The Principal Riverwalk
Running throughout downtown Des Moines is the Principal Riverwalk. The Principal Riverwalk is the result of a unique public-private partnership between the Principal Financial Group and the City of Des Moines. The Riverwalk is 1.2 miles long and includes connections across the river via the Iowa Women of Achievement Bridge and a converted train trestle bridge. The areas surrounding the river include landscaped promenades and large sculptures. It also includes a unique triangular building housing a bathroom and snack shop known as the Hub Spot.

Also on the Riverwalk is the Brenton Skating Plaza. The skating plaza operates as an ice skating rink throughout the winter. During the summer, the plaza serves as a concert space for many events. A large canopy is erected over the plaza during the summer to protect patrons from the sun and the elements. A fenced in dog park can also be found along the riverwalk, located near the Iowa Women of Achievement Bridge. Additionally, a unique children's park is located near the Iowa Women of Achievement Park that was donated to the city by the Rotary Club. The park is in the shape of a fishing bobber and includes swings and seating areas for parents.

Music, art, and culture
The Des Moines Symphony is based at the Civic Center of Greater Des Moines. Ballet Des Moines, primarily based out of Hoyt Sherman Place northwest of downtown, occasionally stages performances at the Civic Center as well.

Every year, the Western Gateway Park area hosts the Des Moines Arts Festival, 80/35 Music Festival and the World Food and Music Festival.

Entertainment venues

Downtown is home to a variety of unique entertainment venues for many different performance mediums. The wide array of performance venues adds to the creative vibe of downtown Des Moines. Each performance venue offers its own unique attributes and atmosphere and speaks to a wide variety of audiences. The venues are listed below.

Des Moines Performing Arts Civic Center
Temple for the Performing Arts
Simon Estes Amphitheater
Kum and Go Theater
Stoner Theater
Wells Fargo Arena
Veterans Memorial Auditorium

See also
Younker Brothers Department Store

References

External links

Neighborhood Site
Historic East Village

Geography of Des Moines, Iowa